Selima may refer to:

People 
 Selima, a character in the film The Sleeping Dictionary (2003)
 Selima Hill (born 1945), a British poet
 Selima Kurumova (1914–1968), a Chechen writer
 Selima Murad (c. 1905–1974), an Iraqi Jewish singer 
 Selima Sfar (born 1977), a Tunisian tennis player

Other 
 Selima Oasis, an oasis with ancient ruins in the Sudan
 Selima (horse), a Thoroughbred racehorse 
 Selima Stakes, an American Thoroughbred horse race
 Selimanosaurus, a nomen nudum of Dicraeosaurus

See also 
 Salima (disambiguation)